A Gentleman's Agreement is a 1918 American silent drama film directed by David Smith and starring Gayne Whitman, Nell Shipman, Juan de la Cruz, Jacob Abrams, and Hattie Buskirk. The film was released by Vitagraph Company of America on July 29, 1918.

Plot

Cast
 Gayne Whitman as Allen Spargo (as Alfred Whitman)
 Nell Shipman as Theresa Kane
 Juan de la Cruz as Lemuel Antree
 Jacob Abrams as Prof. Kane (as Jake Abraham)
 Hattie Buskirk as Mrs. Kane
 J. Carlton Wetherby as Jerry Pitkin (as Jack Wetherby)
 Al Ernest Garcia as Manager of Mine (as Al Garcia)
 Patricia Palmer as Kate Leonard

Preservation
The film is now considered lost.

References

External links
 
 
 
 

Silent American drama films
1918 films
American silent feature films
American black-and-white films
Vitagraph Studios films
1918 lost films
Lost American films
1918 drama films
Lost drama films
1910s American films